Jim Roskind is an American software engineer best known for designing the QUIC protocol in 2012 while an employee of Google. As of 2018, QUIC was used in 8% of all internet traffic. Roskind co-founded Infoseek in 1994 with 7 other people, including Steve Kirsch. Later in 1994, Roskind wrote the Python profiler which is still part of the Python standard library. From 1995 to 2003 he was an employee at Netscape, during which he appeared in the PBS documentary Code Rush.

Brokerage dispute 
While at Netscape in 1996, he successfully brought a lawsuit against Morgan Stanley, arguing that the way they sold his stock caused him to get a lower price than he should have. That case was appealed up to the US Supreme Court, which declined to hear the case, leaving in place a precedent where individuals can sue stock brokers for violations of state law.

References 

American software engineers

American computer programmers
Year of birth missing (living people)

Living people
Massachusetts Institute of Technology alumni